Temir may refer to:
 Timur (name), a Turkic and Mongolic name and a variety of people by that name
 Timur (1336–1405), a Central Asian ruler and conqueror
 Khan Temir (16th century-1637), a Budjak Horde khan
 Temir, a town in Aktobe Province, Kazakhstan
 Temir District, a district in Aktobe Province, Kazakhstan
 Temir, Kyrgyzstan, a village in Issyk-Kul Region, Kyrgyzstan
 Temir-Kanat, a village in Issyk-Kul Region, Kyrgyzstan
 Temir-Khan-Shura, a fortified outpost in Russia, now called Buynaksk
 Temir komuz, a Kirgiz Jewish harp